Szynwałd may refer to the following places:
Szynwałd, Grudziądz County in Kuyavian-Pomeranian Voivodeship (north-central Poland)
Szynwałd, Sępólno County in Kuyavian-Pomeranian Voivodeship (north-central Poland)
Szynwałd, Lesser Poland Voivodeship (south Poland)